There is a body of films that feature miniature people. The concept of a human shrinking in size has existed since the beginning of cinema, with early films using camera techniques to change perceptions of human sizes. The earliest film to have a shrunken person was a 1901 short The Dwarf and the Giant by Georges Méliès in which a character was split into two, with one growing in size and the other shrinking. Before digital effects became commonplace, composite screens were used to create the illusion of miniature people. The element appeared in numerous B movies. James Luxford, writing for the British Film Institute, said, "Each era has used the scenario for very different purposes, in ways that often reflect the anxieties of the time." He added, "The reason shrinking characters have been so popular in films is that they enable the viewer to see the world in a different way."

Don Kaye, writing for Den of Geek!, said, "The 'shrinking person' genre got its start in the early ‘30s, with nearly each decade since then offering up its own variation on the theme. Some have been frightening, some humorous, and others just plain ludicrous -- but all tap into that deep-seated fear of being diminished in a world that looms too large around us." In the 1960s, Fantastic Voyage featured miniature people, but no major film revisited the concept until the 1980s. Grantlands Claire L. Evans said during this decade, "The conceit, being inherently silly, was reframed as a vehicle for broad physical comedies and family movies." She said, "These kinds of films reframe domestic life—a bowl of cereal, the family cat—as a cinematic landscape of awe and terror as exotic as anything on an alien world."

List of films

See also
The Lord of the Rings film trilogy (2001–2003), which used similar techniques to portray some actors as Hobbits at a height of two to four feet (0.6 to 1.2 m) tall

TV series featuring miniature people:
World of Giants (1959)
Land of the Giants (1968–1970)
Honey, I Shrunk the Kids: The TV Show (1997–2000)
Hawkeye: While facing off against the Tracksuit Mafia, Kate Bishop uses an arrow that shrinks down a van with people from the Mafia inside. It is later carried away by an owl.

References

Miniature people, list of films featuring